Muhammad Iqbal Memon is a Pakistani civil servant in BPS-21 Grade, currently serving as the Commissioner Karachi Division. Memon belongs to the Pakistan Administrative Service and is presently posted in the Government of Sindh.

His work during his tenure as Commissioner Karachi from October 2021 was largely focused on bring reforms to the Divisional Administration, as-well as streamlining multiple projects initiated by the Government of Sindh, effectively spearheading various infrastructure and social development projects across the Division. As of recently, his work has been focused on providing relief to flood affected victims of the 2022 floods along with restoring Karachi's infrastructure after the record-breaking monsoons.

Memon was promoted to the rank of Additional Chief Secretary (Provincial Government) / Additional Secretary (Federal Government) in 2020.

Family and education 
Memon belongs to an influential family and is the second youngest out of his 5 siblings. Memon's father retired as an Assistant Commissioner during a period when they were granted magisterial powers. His brother; Farooq Azam Memon is also a Grade-21 Officer who currently serves as Chief Commissioner of Hyderabad.

Muhammad Iqbal Memon attained a bachelors in urban development and holds two masters, one for Public Policy and another for economics, both of which he obtained from the United Kingdom.

Career 
Memon belongs to the Pakistan Administrative Service and serves as the Commissioner Karachi Division. He has served as the Chairman Enquiries & Anti-Corruption Establishment, one of the most coveted posts in the province from October 2020 till August 2021. Memon has also served as the Additional Chief Secretary (Services) after his promotion to BPS-21 while also having served as the Secretary (General Administration).

Muhammad Iqbal Memon has served in the Government of Pakistan, Government of Sindh and Government of Balochistan. He is batchmates with Ahsan Mangi (PAS) and Hassan Naqvi (PAS). He served the Federal Government in the capacity of the Census Commissioner from 2018 to 2019.

Iqbal Memon began his career as an Assistant Commissioner in Balochistan province, after which his services were placed with the Government of Sindh. He has also served as the District Coordinating Officer (modern day Deputy Commissioner) and enjoyed magisterial powers in both District Khairpur and District Dadu. Memon rose to immense prominence after serving as the DCO of Dadu during the historic 2010 super-floods where he was praised for his handling of the natural calamity by the Federal and Provincial Governments and international organizations.

Iqbal Memon has also served on key positions in the Chief Minister Office of Sindh, having served as the Deputy Secretary (Staff) a coveted post and then Additional Secretary (Staff) in the early 2010s with then Chief Minister, Qaim Ali Shah.

Having an educational background in economics, Memon was the Chief Economist of Sindh in 2012.

See also 

 Pakistan Administrative Service
 Chief Secretary Sindh
 Grade-22
 Secretary Establishment Division

References 

Pakistani civil servants
Government of Pakistan
Government of Sindh
Government of Balochistan, Pakistan
Year of birth missing (living people)
Living people